The Roman Catholic Diocese of Weetebula is a suffragan Latin diocese in the Ecclesiastical province of the Metropolitan of Kupang in Indonesia. It pastorally serves all of Sumba Island.

Its cathedral episcopal see is Katedral Roh Kudus, located in the city of Weetebula, Nusa Tenggara Timur.

History 
 Established on October 20, 1959 as the Apostolic Prefecture of Weetebula, on territory split off from the then Apostolic Vicariate of Endeh (now a Metropolitan Archdiocese)
 Promoted on February 6, 1969 as Diocese of Weetebula.

Ordinaries 
(all Roman Rite, so far missionary members of Latin congregations)

 Apostolic Prefects of Weetebula 
 Fr. Gerard J. Legeland, Holy Ghost Fathers (C.SS.R.) (March 15, 1960 – death 1969)
Apostolic Administrator (1969 – 1975) Fr. Wilhelm Wagener, C.SS.R.
Apostolic Administrator (1975 – 1980) Fr. Henricus Haripranata, Society of Jesus (S.J.)

Suffragan Bishops of Weetebula 
 Gerulfus Kherubim Pareira, Divine Word Missionaries (S.V.D.) (December 21, 1985 – January 19, 2008), later Bishop of Maumere (Indonesia) (2008.01.19 – ...)
 Edmund Woga, C.SS.R. (July 16, 2009 - ...)

Sources and external links
 GCatholic.org
 Catholic Hierarchy

Roman Catholic dioceses in Indonesia
Christian organizations established in 1959
Roman Catholic dioceses and prelatures established in the 20th century